Sergei Babenko (born 19 September 1961) is an Estonian retired professional basketball player who played mostly at the shooting guard position. His most notable achievement as a member of the Soviet Union national team was the winning of the silver medal in the 1987 EuroBasket competition. He was also a member of KK Kalev, who won the USSR Premier Basketball League in 1991. He was 6th in EuroBasket 1993 with Estonia national team.

References

External links
Sergei Babenko at esbl.ee

1961 births
Living people
Estonian men's basketball players
FIBA EuroBasket-winning players
PBC CSKA Moscow players
Soviet men's basketball players